The Cadiz Main Street Residential District is a  historic district in Cadiz, Kentucky which was listed on the National Register of Historic Places in 1989.  It runs along Main St., between Line St. and Scott St., and included 32 contributing buildings.

It consists of houses, related outbuildings, and one church:  the 1903 Gothic Revival-style Cadiz Baptist Church.

The Cadiz Downtown Historic District, listed on the National Register in 1988 is along Main St. directly to its west.

References

Historic districts on the National Register of Historic Places in Kentucky
Italianate architecture in Kentucky
Queen Anne architecture in Kentucky
Buildings and structures completed in 1880
National Register of Historic Places in Trigg County, Kentucky
Residential buildings on the National Register of Historic Places in Kentucky
Main Street Residential District